Canarium asperum is a species of plant in the family Burseraceae. It is found in Brunei, Indonesia (Java), Malaysia, Papua New Guinea, the Philippines, and the Solomon Islands.

References

asperum
Trees of Malesia
Trees of Papuasia
Least concern plants
Taxonomy articles created by Polbot